Mario Fazio (26 July 1919 – 13 November 1983) was an Italian racing cyclist. He rode in the 1948 Tour de France.

References

External links
 

1919 births
1983 deaths
Italian male cyclists
Sportspeople from Catania
Cyclists from Sicily